Jacques Bialski (3 October 1929 – 10 June 2013) was a French politician, who was a member of the Senate for Nord (1979–1997).

References

1929 births
2013 deaths
French Senators of the Fifth Republic
People from Dunkirk
Politicians from Hauts-de-France
Senators of Nord (French department)
French people of Polish descent
Socialist Party (France) politicians